Mount Bird is a  high shield volcano standing about  south of Cape Bird, the northern extremity of Ross Island. It was mapped by the British National Antarctic Expedition, 1901–04, under Robert Falcon Scott, and apparently named by them after Cape Bird. Endeavour Piedmont Glacier lies on its slopes.

There are several western lobes of the Mount Bird icecap. One of these is Quaternary Icefall, which descends steeply into Wohlschlag Bay 1 mile (1.6 km) south of Cinder Hill. The site was mapped and so named by the New Zealand Geological Survey Antarctic Expedition (NZGSAE), 1958–59, because of the Quaternary glacial period marine shells carried by the glacier and deposited in terminal moraines. Another such lobe is Shell Glacier.

See also
List of volcanoes in Antarctica

References

 
 Mount Bird , Volcano World

Volcanoes of Ross Island
Polygenetic shield volcanoes
Pliocene shield volcanoes